Erlan Zamanbekuly Turgymbaev , Erlan Zamanbekūly Tūrğymbaev; born 14 August 1962) is a Kazakh politician, Minister of Internal Affairs (12 February 2019 – 16 April 2022). From February 2022 to August 17, 2022 — Advisor to the President of the Republic of Kazakhstan.

Biography

Early life and education 
Turgymbaev was born in the city Alma-Ata (now Almaty). In 1984 he graduated from the Law Faculty of the Al-Farabi Kazakh National University specializing in law and in 2003 from the Faculty of Economics.

Career 
After graduating, Turgymbaev served as a detective in the criminal investigation of the Department of Internal Affairs of the Saransk City Executive Committee in the Karaganda Region. From 1986 to 2001, he held various leadership positions in the investigative and operational units of the Alatau and Kalinin district Internal Affairs departments, as well as the Police Department of Almaty.

In 2001, Turgymbaev became the Managing Director of NAC Kazatomprom CJSC and from 2002, he was the head of the 9th Department of the Ministry of Internal Affairs. That same year, he was appointed as the head of the Criminal Police Department of the Ministry of Internal Affairs until April 2003, when Turgymbaev became the head of the Internal Affairs Directorate of the North Kazakhstan Region. From March 2006, Turgymbaev served as chairman of the Investigative Committee of the Ministry of Internal Affairs and in August 2006, he was appointed as the head of the Department of Internal Affairs of Almaty. 

In December 2012, Turgymbaev was appointed as a Deputy Minister of Internal Affairs of Kazakhstan. He served that position until he became the Minister on 12 February 2019 after his predecessor Kalmukhanbet Kassymov was appointed as a secretary of the Security Council.

References 

1962 births
Living people
People from Almaty
Government ministers of Kazakhstan
Nur Otan politicians
Al-Farabi Kazakh National University alumni